New Heavenly Sword and Dragon Sabre is a Hong Kong television series adapted from Louis Cha's novel The Heaven Sword and Dragon Saber. The series was first broadcast on TVB Jade in Hong Kong in 1986.

Plot

Cast

 Tony Leung as Cheung Mo-kei
Kitty Lai as Chiu Man
 Sheren Tang as Chow Chi-yeuk
 Ng Hin-wai as Yeung Bat-fui
 Yung Wai-man as Kei Hiu-fu
 Maggie Shiu as Siu-chiu
 Simon Yam as Cheung Tsui-san
 Carol Cheng as Yan So-so
 Chan On-ying as Yan Lei
 Kenneth Tsang as Tse Shun 
 Wong Sun as Yu-yeung Prince
 Lau Kong as Sing Kwan
 Liu Kai-chi as Yu Doi-ngam
 Chun Hung as Sack Monk
 Wilson Tsui as Cheung Chung-kai
 Lee Shu-kah as Mok Sing-kuk
 Toi Chi-wai as Yan Lei-ting
 Bau Fong as Cheung Sam-fung
 Lung Tin-sang as Yu Lin-chow
 Tam Bing-man as Chu Cheung-ling
 Lau Dan as Ho Tai-chung
 Wong Man-yee as Ding Man-kwan
 Lee Heung-kam as Mit-juet
 Wong Wan-choi as Sung Yun-kiu
 Ho Shu-wing as Sung Ching-shu
 Chun Wong as Chow Din
 Mak Tsi-wan as Lang Hin
 Tsang Wai-ming as Pang Ying-yuk
 Cheung Lui as Yan Ye-wong
 Lam Tin as Yan Tin-cheng
 Benz Hui as Wai Yat-siu
 Leung Hung-wah as Seung Yu-chun
 Cheng Fan-sang as Luk Cheung-hak
 Chu Kong as Ha Bat-yung
 Michael Tao as Fan Yiu
 Amy Hu as Golden Flower Granny
 Ho Kwai-lam as Chan Yau-leung
 Mak Ho-wai as Chu Yun-cheung
 Shallin Tse as Yellow Dress Maiden
 Fung Kok as Wong Bo-bo
 Kwan Hoi-san as Wu Ching-ngau
 Yan Pak as Wong Nam-ku
 Lau Bik-yee as Chu Kau-chan
 Tsang Wai-wan as Mou Ching-ying
 Margie Tsang as Kwok Seung (cameo)
 Felix Lok as Do Dai-kam
 Lau Siu-ming
 Eddy Ko as Gok yun (cameo)

External links

1986 Hong Kong television series debuts
1986 Hong Kong television series endings
TVB dramas
Hong Kong wuxia television series
Television shows based on The Heaven Sword and Dragon Saber
Television series set in the Yuan dynasty
Sequel television series
Television series about orphans
Television shows about rebels
Television shows set on islands
Cantonese-language television shows